Krutovo is a rural locality (a village) in Petushinskoye Rural Settlement, Petushinsky District, Vladimir Oblast, Russia. The population was 271 as of 2010. There are 4 streets.

Geography 
Krutovo is located on the Klyazma River, 10 km south of Petushki (the district's administrative centre) by road. Petushki is the nearest rural locality.

References 

Rural localities in Petushinsky District